The 1993 NCAA men's volleyball tournament was the 24th annual tournament to determine the national champion of NCAA men's collegiate volleyball. The tournament was played at Pauley Pavilion in Los Angeles, California during May 1993.

UCLA defeated Cal State Northridge in the final match, 3–0 (15–8, 15–11, 15–10), to win their fourteenth national title. The Bruins (24–3) were coached by Al Scates.

UCLA's Mike Sealy and Jeff Nygaard were named the tournament's Most Outstanding Players. Sealy and Nygaard, along with five other players, comprised the All-Tournament Team.

Qualification
Until the creation of the NCAA Men's Division III Volleyball Championship in 2012, there was only a single national championship for men's volleyball. As such, all NCAA men's volleyball programs, whether from Division I, Division II, or Division III, were eligible. A total of 4 teams were invited to contest this championship.

Tournament bracket 
Site: Pauley Pavilion, Los Angeles, California

All tournament team 
Mike Sealy, UCLA (Most outstanding player)
Jeff Nygaard, UCLA (Most outstanding player)
Kevin Wong, UCLA
Dan Landry, UCLA
 Axel Hager, Cal State Northridge
Ken Lynch, Cal State Northridge
Coley Kyman, Cal State Northridge

See also 
 NCAA Men's National Collegiate Volleyball Championship
 NCAA Women's Volleyball Championships (Division I, Division II, Division III)

References

1993
NCAA Men's Volleyball Championship
NCAA Men's Volleyball Championship
1993 in sports in California
Volleyball in California